Qaravultomba (also, Karaultomba and Karovultomba) is a village in the Gadabay Rayon of Azerbaijan.  The village forms part of the municipality of Parakənd.

References 

Populated places in Gadabay District